Henry Adetokunboh Akinwande (born 12 October 1965) is a British former professional boxer who competed from 1989 to 2008. He held the WBO heavyweight title from 1996 to 1997, as well as the Commonwealth heavyweight title in 1993, and the European heavyweight title from 1993 to 1994.

Early years
Akinwande was born in London, England but went to live in his parents homeland of Nigeria as a 4-year-old and returned to England in 1986 aged 21, and he began boxing soon after.

Amateur career
As an amateur boxing out of the Lynn amateur boxing club in Camberwell, SE London, he was ABA heavyweight champion in both 1988 and 1989, beating another fellow Nigerian and future WBO heavyweight champion Herbie Hide and represented Great Britain in the heavyweight division at the 1988 Olympic Games in Seoul, South Korea.

ABA Championships record

 at the 1986 ABA Championships, heavyweight:
 Preliminaries: Defeated D. Stewart on points
 1/32: Defeated A. Denham on points
 1/16: Defeated I. Joseph on points
 1/8: Defeated D. Simmonds on points
 1/4: Defeated R. Flanagan KO 1
 1/2: Defeated L. Maxwell on points
 Finals: Lost to E. Cardouza DQ 3

 at the 1987 ABA Championships, heavyweight:
 Preliminaries: Defeated Roger Mc Kenzie on points
 1/32: Defeated T. Denham KO 1
 1/16: Defeated A. Kerrick on points
 1/8: Defeated M. Stevens ab.1
 1/4: Defeated G. Sanderson on points
 1/2: Defeated K. Mc Cormack KO 1
 Finals: Lost to Jim Moran on points

 at the 1988 ABA Championships, heavyweight:
 1/32: Defeated T. Denham KO 1
 1/16: Defeated M. Stevens on points
 1/8: Defeated Darren Westover on points
 1/4: Defeated S. Henry on points
 1/2: Defeated R. Martin KO 1
 Finals: Defeated H. Hylton on points

 at the 1989 ABA Championships, heavyweight:
 1/32: Defeated J. Lewis on points
 1/16: Defeated M. Lynch KO 1
 1/8: Defeated B. Auckett KO 1
 1/4: Defeated D. Abbott KO 2
 1/2: Defeated Chris Coughlin KO 1
 Finals: Defeated Herbie Hide on points.

Olympic results
1988 Olympic Games, Seoul, heavyweight:
 1/4: Lost to Arnold Vanderlyde (Netherlands) on points

Professional career
Akinwande made his professional debut in 1989 against Carlton Headley in London and won all of his first 18 bouts, including a second-round KO victory over former World Light Heavyweight Champion J.B. Williamson, and relatively well known fringe fighters such as Marshall Tillman, Eddie Taylor, Kimmuel Odum and John Fury.

Akinwande then challenged Axel Schulz for the vacant European heavyweight title in Berlin, Germany in 1992. The fight, scored only by the referee was adjudged to be a draw after 12 rounds. This was felt by many to be a "home town" decision, as most observers had Akinwande winning comfortably.

Following a victory over New Zealand's respectable James Thunder for the Commonwealth title in 1993, Akinwande again challenged Schulz for the vacant European belt. This time three judges were employed and Akinwande was awarded a unanimous decision after 12 rounds. He was to defend the title twice, against Biagio Chianese and Mario Scheisser. Akinwande also defeated fellow Briton and future WBO cruiserweight champion Johnny Nelson, former IBF heavyweight title holder Tony Tucker, Frankie Swindell, Brian Sargent, Calvin Jones and Gerard Jones, all from the USA, during this period.

WBO heavyweight champion
In 1996 Akinwande faced American Jeremy Williams for the WBO World Heavyweight Title which had been vacated by Riddick Bowe, a fight which Akinwande was to win via a 3rd round stoppage. Akinwande went on to defend the belt twice, with victories over Russian Alexander Zolkin by TKO and a decision over fellow Briton Scott Welch, who had won the WBO Intercontinental Title with a stoppage over the 46-year-old Joe Bugner.

Akinwande vs. Lewis

The WBO belt was then vacated so that Akinwande could pursue a challenge to WBC champion Lennox Lewis in 1997. The fight took place at Caesars Tahoe in Nevada. Akinwande was strangely subdued and spent much of the fight attempting to clinch Lewis. After repeated warnings, referee Mills Lane finally ran out of patience and disqualified Akinwande for repeated holding in the 5th round.

A proposed challenge to Evander Holyfield for the WBA belt in 1998 was later abandoned after Akinwande tested positive for hepatitis B. This meant a lengthy spell of recovery for Akinwande, but he was finally cleared to return to the ring in 1999.

Akinwande won his next 8 fights, his victims included top contenders Orlin Norris and Maurice Harris, as well as Peter McNeeley, Kenny Craven, Russel Chasteen, Reynaldo Minus, Chris Sirengo and Najee Shaheed.

A fight with Oliver McCall in 2001 resulted in Akinwande's second defeat. After Akinwande had outboxed McCall for most of the fight, Akinwande began to tire, and McCall caught him with a few seconds remaining in the 10th and final round. Akinwande was counted out.

Akinwande recovered from this to win his next 9 bouts, including notable victories against Timo Hoffman, Ed Mahone, Cisse Salif and Anton Nel, all for the IBF Intercontinental Title, as well as Curt Paige, Sam Ubokane, Raman Sukhaterin, Alexander Vasiliev and Tipton Walker.

In late 2006 he dropped a split decision to Oleg Platov, a bout in which Akinwande received a point deduction in 8th round for holding, and Platov received a point deduction in 9th for head butt.

After that fight he won another fight against Andriy Oleinyk in 2007 before losing to top prospect Ondřej Pála from the Czech Republic by unanimous decision on 4 July 2008, which turned out to be his last fight.

Professional boxing record

References

External links

BoxingRecords

1965 births
Living people
Boxers from Greater London
English male boxers
English people of Nigerian descent
English people of Yoruba descent
Yoruba sportspeople
Heavyweight boxers
Boxers at the 1988 Summer Olympics
Olympic boxers of Great Britain
World heavyweight boxing champions
World Boxing Organization champions
England Boxing champions
European Boxing Union champions
Commonwealth Boxing Council champions